The following outline is provided as an overview of and topical guide to Yemen:

Yemen – sovereign country located on the southern portion of the Arabian Peninsula in Southwest Asia.  With a population of more than 20 million people, Yemen is bordered by Saudi Arabia to the North, the Red Sea to the West, the Arabian Sea and Gulf of Aden to the South, and Oman to the east. Yemen's territory includes over 200 islands, the largest of which is Socotra, about 415 kilometres (259 miles) to the south of Yemen, off the coast of Somalia. Yemen is the only republic on the Arabian Peninsula.

General reference 

 Pronunciation:
 Common English country name:  Yemen
 Official English country name:  The Republic of Yemen
 Common endonym(s):  
 Official endonym(s):  
 Adjectival(s): Yemeni
 Demonym(s):
 Etymology: Name of Yemen
 International rankings of Yemen
 ISO country codes:  YE, YEM, 887
 ISO region codes:  See ISO 3166-2:YE
 Internet country code top-level domain:  .ye

Geography of Yemen 

Geography of Yemen
 Yemen is: a country
 Location:
 Northern Hemisphere and Eastern Hemisphere
 Eurasia
 Asia
 Southwest Asia
 Middle East
 Arabian Peninsula
 Time zone:  UTC+03
 Extreme points of Yemen
 High:  Jabal an Nabi Shu'ayb 
 Low:  Arabian Sea 0 m
 Land boundaries:  1,746 km
 1,458 km
 288 km
 Coastline:  1,906 km
 Population of Yemen: 22,389,000  - 50th most populous country

 Area of Yemen: 527,968 km2
 Atlas of Yemen

Environment of Yemen 

 Climate of Yemen
 Ecoregions in Yemen
 Renewable energy in Yemen
 Geology of Yemen
 Protected areas of Yemen
 Biosphere reserves in Yemen
 National parks of Yemen
 Wildlife of Yemen
 Fauna of Yemen
 Birds of Yemen
 Mammals of Yemen

Natural geographic features of Yemen 

 Glaciers of Yemen: none
 Islands of Yemen
 Lakes of Yemen
 Mountains of Yemen
 Volcanoes in Yemen
 Rivers of Yemen
 Waterfalls of Yemen
 Valleys of Yemen
 World Heritage Sites in Yemen

Regions of Yemen 

Regions of Yemen

Ecoregions of Yemen 

List of ecoregions in Yemen
 Ecoregions in Yemen

Administrative divisions of Yemen 

Administrative divisions of Yemen
Yemen is divided into 21 governorates, subdivided into 333 districts (muderiah) and 2,210 sub-districts.
 Governorates of Yemen
 Districts of Yemen
 Sub-districts of Yemen
 Municipalities of Yemen

Governorates of Yemen 

Governorates of Yemen

Districts of Yemen 

Districts of Yemen
 The governorates of Yemen are divided into 333 districts (muderiah).

Sub-districts of Yemen 

 Yemen's districts are subdivided into 2,210 sub-districts, and then into 38,284 villages (as of 2001).

Municipalities of Yemen 

Municipalities of Yemen
 Capital of Yemen: Sana'a
 Cities of Yemen

Demography of Yemen 

Demographics of Yemen
 Women in Yemen

Government and politics of Yemen 

Politics of Yemen
 Form of government: presidential representative democratic republic
 Capital of Yemen: Sana'a
 Elections in Yemen
 Political parties in Yemen

Branches of the government of Yemen 

Government of Yemen

Executive branch of the government of Yemen 
 Head of state: President of Yemen, Ali Abdullah Saleh
 Vice President of Yemen, Abd al-Rab Mansur al-Hadi
 Head of government (appointed by the President): Prime Minister of Yemen, Ali Muhammad Mujawar
 Cabinet of Yemen

Legislative branch of the government of Yemen 

 Parliament of Yemen (bicameral)
 Upper house: Assembly of Representatives of Yemen (301 members, each elected to serve a 6-year term)
 Lower house: Consultative Council of Yemen (ar) (59 members, appointed by the President)

Judicial branch of the government of Yemen 

Court system of Yemen
 Supreme Court of Yemen (ar)
 Commercial Courts of Yemen

Foreign relations of Yemen 

Foreign relations of Yemen
 Diplomatic missions in Yemen
 Diplomatic missions of Yemen

International organization membership 

International organization membership of Yemen
The Republic of Yemen is a member of:

African Union/United Nations Hybrid operation in Darfur (UNAMID)
Arab Fund for Economic and Social Development (AFESD)
Arab Monetary Fund (AMF)
Council of Arab Economic Unity (CAEU)
Food and Agriculture Organization (FAO)
Group of 77 (G77)
International Atomic Energy Agency (IAEA)
International Bank for Reconstruction and Development (IBRD)
International Civil Aviation Organization (ICAO)
International Criminal Court (ICCt) (signatory)
International Criminal Police Organization (Interpol)
International Development Association (IDA)
International Federation of Red Cross and Red Crescent Societies (IFRCS)
International Finance Corporation (IFC)
International Fund for Agricultural Development (IFAD)
International Labour Organization (ILO)
International Maritime Organization (IMO)
International Monetary Fund (IMF)
International Olympic Committee (IOC)
International Organization for Migration (IOM)
International Organization for Standardization (ISO) (correspondent)
International Red Cross and Red Crescent Movement (ICRM)
International Telecommunication Union (ITU)
International Telecommunications Satellite Organization (ITSO)
International Trade Union Confederation (ITUC)
Inter-Parliamentary Union (IPU)
Islamic Development Bank (IDB)

League of Arab States (LAS)
Multilateral Investment Guarantee Agency (MIGA)
Nonaligned Movement (NAM)
Organisation of Islamic Cooperation (OIC)
Organisation for the Prohibition of Chemical Weapons (OPCW)
Organization of American States (OAS) (observer)
United Nations (UN)
United Nations Conference on Trade and Development (UNCTAD)
United Nations Educational, Scientific, and Cultural Organization (UNESCO)
United Nations High Commissioner for Refugees (UNHCR)
United Nations Industrial Development Organization (UNIDO)
United Nations Mission for the Referendum in Western Sahara (MINURSO)
United Nations Mission in Liberia (UNMIL)
United Nations Mission in the Central African Republic and Chad (MINURCAT)
United Nations Mission in the Sudan (UNMIS)
United Nations Observer Mission in Georgia (UNOMIG)
United Nations Operation in Cote d'Ivoire (UNOCI)
United Nations Organization Mission in the Democratic Republic of the Congo (MONUC)
Universal Postal Union (UPU)
World Customs Organization (WCO)
World Federation of Trade Unions (WFTU)
World Health Organization (WHO)
World Intellectual Property Organization (WIPO)
World Meteorological Organization (WMO)
World Tourism Organization (UNWTO)
World Trade Organization (WTO) (observer)

Military of Yemen 

Military of Yemen
 Command
 Commander-in-chief:
 Defense Minister  (ar) : Mohammed Nasser Ahmed Ali (ar)
 Military: 
 Army of Yemen
 Yemeni Air Force and Air Defense
 Navy of Yemen
 Yemeni border guards (ar)
 Yemeni strategic reserve forces (ar) :
 Special forces of Yemen (ar)
 Yemeni presidential protection forces (ar)
 missile brigades (Yemen) (ar)
 Reserve forces for the Ministry of Defense (Yemen) (ar) :
 Military history of Yemen(ar)
 1st Armoured Division (ar)
 Republican Guard
 Military ranks of Yemen (ar)

Local government in Yemen 

Local government in Yemen

History of Yemen 

History of Yemen
 Timeline of the history of Yemen
 Current events of Yemen
 Military history of Yemen

Culture of Yemen 

Culture of Yemen
 Architecture of Yemen
 Cuisine of Yemen
 Festivals in Yemen
 Languages of Yemen
 Media in Yemen
 National symbols of Yemen
 Emblem of Yemen
 Flag of Yemen
 National anthem of Yemen
 Prostitution in Yemen
 Public holidays in Yemen
 Records of Yemen
 Religion in Yemen
 Christianity in Yemen
 Hinduism in Yemen
 Islam in Yemen
 Judaism in Yemen
 Sikhism in Yemen
 World Heritage Sites in Yemen

Art in Yemen 
 Art in Yemen
 Cinema of Yemen
 Literature of Yemen
 Music of Yemen
 Television in Yemen
 Theatre in Yemen

Sports in Yemen 

Sports in Yemen
 Football in Yemen
 Yemen at the Olympics

Economy and infrastructure of Yemen 

Economy of Yemen
 Economic rank, by nominal GDP (2007): 88th (eighty-eighth)
 Agriculture in Yemen
 Banking in Yemen
 National Bank of Yemen
 Communications in Yemen
 Internet in Yemen
 Companies of Yemen
Currency of Yemen: Rial
ISO 4217: YER
 Energy in Yemen
 Energy policy of Yemen
 Oil industry in Yemen
 Mining in Yemen
 Yemen Stock Exchange
 Tourism in Yemen
 Transport in Yemen
 Airports in Yemen
 Rail transport in Yemen
 Roads in Yemen
 Water supply and sanitation in Yemen

Education in Yemen 

Education in Yemen

Health in Yemen 

Health in Yemen
 Health care in Yemen

See also 

Yemen
Index of Yemen-related articles
List of international rankings
List of Yemen-related topics
Member state of the United Nations
Outline of Asia
Outline of geography

References

External links 

 Government
List of Yemen government links
Yemen Parliament homepage
 General information
Yemeni Students Association Abroad
BBC News Country Profile - Yemen
Economy
Yemen Constitution

Humanitarian news
IRIN Yemen: humanitarian news and analysis
Painstakingly slow progress on poverty reduction
Qat cultivation threatening water resources
Moves afoot to reduce number of fire-arms in cities
Video short on the effect guns have on the local population in Yemen (03:08 - Windows Media Player)

 Other
French Center for Archeology and Social Sciences CEFAS
AAYSP: American Association of Yemeni Scientists and Professionals.
Voter turnout, Gender quotas, Electoral system design and Political party financing in Yemen
Cnn News Report on the eruption

Yemen
 1